Olympiacos Handball Club (currently known for sponsorship reasons as Olympiacos S.F.P. / Omilos Xini) is the men's handball team of the major Greek multi-sport club Olympiacos CFP, based in Piraeus. It was founded initially in 1931 and it was reorganized in 2017, when merged with DIKE.AS. Nea Ionia.The department has won 3 Greek Handball Championships, 2 Greek Cups and 2 Doubles.

In 2017–18 season, which was the first after its reorganization, Olympiacos won the domestic double. They won the Greek Handball Championship by beating AEK Athens with 3–2 wins in the finals in a dramatic fashion, as they overturned an initial 0–2 win lead by AEK and took three straight wins to secure the League title. They also won the Greek Cup, beating PAOK in the semi-final and ASE Douka in the final to complete the domestic Double. On 10 September 2022, Olympiacos lifted the Greek Super Cup after winning AESH Pylaia in the final.

Olympiacos play their games at Manos Loizos Indoor Hall in Nikaia, Piraeus.

Honours
Greek Championship
 Winners (3): 2017–18, 2018–19, 2021–22
Greek Cup
Winners (2): 2017–18, 2018–19
Greek Super Cup
Winners (1): 2022
 Double
 Winners (2): 2017–18, 2018–19

European record

Notable players

Notable coaches
 Giorgos Zaravinas
 Giorgos Karasavvidis
 Nenad Kljaić

Seasons

Current squad
Season 2022–2023

Technical and managerial staff

Sponsorships
Great Sponsor: Xini Group
Official Sport Clothing Manufacturer: Adidas

References

External links

 Olympiacos CFP official website 
 Olympiacos CFP official website – Men's Handball – News, History, Roster 
 Olympiacos H.C. at EHF 

 
Handball
Greek handball clubs